Egypt competed at the 2020 Summer Olympics in Tokyo. Originally scheduled to take place during the summer of 2020, the Games were postponed to 23 July to 8 August 2021, because of the COVID-19 pandemic. Since the nation's debut in 1912, Egyptian athletes have appeared in every edition of the Summer Olympic Games except 1932 and 1980, joining the United States-led boycott in the latter.

Medalists

Competitors
The following is the list of number of competitors in the Games. Note that reserves in football and handball are not counted:

Archery

Two Egyptian archers qualified for the inaugural mixed team event, along with the men's and women's individual recurve, by winning the gold medal at the 2019 African Games in Rabat, Morocco.

Artistic swimming

Egypt fielded a squad of eight artistic swimmers to compete in the women's duet and team event through an African continental selection in the team free routine at the 2019 FINA World Championships in Gwangju, South Korea.

Athletics

Egyptian athletes further achieved the entry standards, either by qualifying time or by world ranking, in the following track and field events (up to a maximum of 3 athletes in each event):

Field events

Badminton

Egypt entered three badminton players (one male and two female) for each of the following events into the Olympic tournament based on the BWF Race to Tokyo Rankings.

Boxing

Egypt entered two boxers into the Olympic tournament. Rio 2016 Olympian and 2015 African Games silver medalist Abdelrahman Oraby scored an outright semifinal victory to secure a spot in the men's light heavyweight division at the 2020 African Qualification Tournament in Diamniadio, Senegal. Reigning African Games champion Yousry Hafez completed the nation's boxing lineup by topping the list of eligible boxers from Africa in the men's super heavyweight division of the IOC's Boxing Task Force Rankings.

Canoeing

Sprint
Egyptian canoeists qualified two boats in each of the following distances for the Games by receiving spare berths freed up by South Africa at the 2019 African Games in Rabat, Morocco.

Qualification Legend: FA = Qualify to final (medal); FB = Qualify to final B (non-medal)

Cycling

Track
Following the completion of the 2020 UCI Track Cycling World Championships, Egypt entered one rider to compete in the women's omnium based on her final individual UCI Olympic rankings.

Omnium

Diving

Egypt sent three divers (two men and one woman) into the Olympic competition by winning the gold medal each in their respective individual events at the 2019 African Qualifying Meet in Durban, South Africa.

Equestrian

Egypt fielded a squad of three equestrian riders into the Olympic team jumping competition for the first time since 1960, after securing an outright berth, as one of two top-ranked nations, at the International Equestrian Federation (FEI)-designated Olympic qualifier for Group F (Africa and Middle East) in Rabat, Morocco.

Jumping

Fencing

Egyptian fencers qualified a full squad each in the men's and women's team foil and men's team sabre for the Games as the highest-ranked nation from Africa outside the world's top four in the FIE Olympic Team Rankings. Rio 2016 Olympian Nada Hafez (women's sabre) earned another place on the Egyptian team as the highest-ranked fencer vying for individual qualification from Africa in the FIE Adjusted Official Rankings, while Mohamed El-Sayed completed the nation's fencing roster for the Games by winning the final match of the men's épée at the African Zonal Qualifier in Cairo.

Men

Women

Football

Summary

Men's tournament

Egypt men's football team qualified for the Games by advancing to the final match of the 2019 Africa U-23 Cup of Nations, signifying the country's recurrence to the Olympic tournament after an eight-year absence.

Team roster

Group play

Quarterfinal

Gymnastics

Artistic
Egypt entered three artistic gymnasts into the Olympic competition. Mandy Mohamed booked a spot in the women's individual all-around and apparatus events, by finishing seventeenth out of the twenty gymnasts eligible for qualification at the 2019 World Championships in Stuttgart, Germany. Meanwhile, Omer Mohamed and Zeina Ibrahim claimed additional places to join Mohamed on the Egyptian squad with a top-two finish in their respective individual events at the 2021 African Championships in Cairo.

Men

Women

Rhythmic 
Egypt fielded a squad of rhythmic gymnasts to compete for the first time at the Olympics, by winning the gold each in the individual and group all-around at the 2020 African Championships in Sharm El Sheikh.

Trampoline
Egypt qualified one gymnast each for the men's and women's trampoline by claiming the top spots, respectively, at the 2021 African Championships in Cairo.

Handball

Summary

Men's tournament

Egypt men's handball team qualified for the Olympics by winning the gold medal and securing an outright berth at the final match of the 2020 African Men's Handball Championship in Tunis, Tunisia.

Team roster

Group play

Quarterfinal

Semifinal

Bronze medal game

Judo
 
Egypt qualified three male judoka for each of the following weight classes at the Games. Mohamed Abdelmawgoud (men's half-lightweight, 66 kg), with Ramadan Darwish (men's half-heavyweight, 100 kg) earning his third consecutive trip to the Games, was selected among the top 18 judoka of their respective weight classes based on the IJF World Ranking List of June 28, 2021, while Rio 2016 Olympian Mohamed Abdelaal (men's half-middleweight, 81 kg) accepted a continental berth from Africa as the nation's top-ranked judoka outside of direct qualifying position.

Karate
 
Egypt entered five karateka into the inaugural Olympic tournament. Ali El-Sawy and 2016 world champion Giana Farouk qualified directly for the men's kumite 67 kg and women's kumite 61-kg category, respectively by finishing among the top four karateka at the end of the combined WKF Olympic Rankings. Feryal Abdelaziz finished among the top three in the final pool round of the women's kumite +61 kg category to secure an additional place on the Egyptian squad at the 2021 World Qualification Tournament in Paris, France. Abdalla Abdelaziz (men's kumite 75 kg) and Radwa Sayed (women's kumite 55 kg) completed the lineup by topping the continental field of karateka vying for qualification from the African zone based on the WKD Olympic Rankings.

Kumite

Modern pentathlon
 
Egyptian athletes qualified for the following spots to compete in modern pentathlon. Rio 2016 Olympian Haydy Morsy secured a spot in the women's event by virtue of her top finish at the 2019 African Championships in Cairo. On the men's side, Ahmed El-Gendy locked the podium with a bronze medal to join Morsy on the Egyptian roster at the 2021 UIPM World Championships in Cairo, with Ahmed Hamed and Amira Kandil receiving the spare berths previously declined by the original entrants, as the next highest-ranked, eligible modern pentathletes in the UIPM World Rankings.

Rowing

Egypt qualified one boat in the men's single sculls for the Games by winning the gold medal and securing the first of five berths available at the 2019 FISA African Olympic Qualification Regatta in Tunis, Tunisia.

Qualification Legend: FA=Final A (medal); FB=Final B (non-medal); FC=Final C (non-medal); FD=Final D (non-medal); FE=Final E (non-medal); FF=Final F (non-medal); SA/B=Semifinals A/B; SC/D=Semifinals C/D; SE/F=Semifinals E/F; QF=Quarterfinals; R=Repechage

Sailing

Egyptian sailors qualified one boat in each of the following classes through the class-associated World Championships and the continental regattas.

M = Medal race; EL = Eliminated – did not advance into the medal race

Shooting

Egyptian shooters achieved quota places for the following events by virtue of their best finishes at the 2018 ISSF World Championships, the 2019 ISSF World Cup series, and African Championships, as long as they obtained a minimum qualifying score (MQS) by 31 May 2020.

Men

Women

Mixed

Swimming

Egyptian swimmers further achieved qualifying standards in the following events (up to a maximum of 2 swimmers in each event at the Olympic Qualifying Time (OQT), and potentially 1 at the Olympic Selection Time (OST)):

Table tennis

Egypt entered six athletes into the table tennis competition at the Games. The men's and women's teams secured their respective Olympic berths by winning the gold medal each at the 2019 African Games in Rabat, Morocco, permitting a maximum of two starters to compete each in the men's and women's singles tournament. Moreover, an additional berth was awarded to the Egyptian table tennis players competing in the inaugural mixed doubles by winning the final match against Nigeria at the 2020 African Olympic Qualification Tournament in Tunis, Tunisia.

Men

Women

Mixed

Taekwondo

Egypt entered four athletes into the taekwondo competition at the Games. Abdelrahman Wael (men's 68 kg), 2014 Youth Olympic bronze medalist Seif Eissa (men's 80 kg), Nour Abdelsalam (women's 49 kg), and Rio 2016 bronze medalist Hedaya Malak (women's 67 kg) secured the spots on the Egyptian squad with a top two finish each in their respective weight classes at the 2020 African Qualification Tournament in Rabat, Morocco.

Tennis

Egypt entered two tennis players into the Olympic tournament for the first time in history. Mohamed Safwat and Mayar Sherif secured an outright berth each in the men's and women's singles, respectively, by winning the gold medal at the 2019 African Games in Rabat, Morocco.

Triathlon

Egypt entered one triathlete to compete at the Olympics for the first time in history. Basmla El-Salamoney topped the field of triathletes vying for qualification from Africa in the women's event based on the individual ITU World Rankings of 15 June 2021.

Wrestling

Egypt qualified eight wrestlers for each of the following classes into the Olympic competition. One of them finished among the top six to book an Olympic berth in the men's Greco-Roman 67 kg at the 2019 World Championships, while seven additional licenses were awarded to the Egyptian wrestlers, who progressed to the top two finals of their respective weight categories at the 2021 African & Oceania Qualification Tournament in Hammamet, Tunisia.

Freestyle

Greco-Roman

See also
Egypt at the 2020 Summer Paralympics

References

External links 

Nations at the 2020 Summer Olympics
2020
2021 in Egyptian sport